The 2014 Brasil Open was a tennis tournament played on indoor clay courts. It was the 14th edition of the event known as the Brasil Open, and part of the ATP World Tour 250 series of the 2014 ATP World Tour. It took place from February 24 through March 2, 2014, in São Paulo, Brazil.

Singles main-draw entrants

Seeds 

1 Rankings as of February 17, 2014.

Other entrants 
The following players received wildcards into the main draw:
  Thomaz Bellucci
  Guilherme Clezar
  João Souza

The following players received entry from the qualifying draw:
 Rogério Dutra Silva
 Gastão Elias
 Pere Riba
 Potito Starace

Retirements
  Tommy Haas (right shoulder injury)
  João Souza (abdominal pain injury)

Doubles main-draw entrants

Seeds 

1 Rankings are as of February 17, 2014.

Other entrants 
The following pairs received wildcards into the main draw:
 Guilherme Clezar /  Marcelo Demoliner
 André Sá /  João Souza

Champions

Singles 

  Federico Delbonis def.  Paolo Lorenzi, 4–6, 6–3, 6–4

Doubles 

  Guillermo García López /  Philipp Oswald def.  Juan Sebastián Cabal /  Robert Farah, 5–7, 6–4, [15–13]

External links 
 

 
Brasil Open